Anarpia iranella is a moth in the family Crambidae. It was described by Zerny in 1939. It is found in Iran.

References

Moths described in 1939
Scopariinae
Moths of Asia